The Ora Lightning Cat is a battery electric compact sedan produced by Chinese EV manufacturer Ora, a marque of Great Wall Motors since 2022.

Overview

The Ora Lightning Cat was first revealed as a concept at Auto Shanghai on April 21, 2021 in Shanghai, China, alongside the Ora Punk Cat. A different Lightning Cat was shown later in September at the 2021 International Motor Show Germany in Frankfurt, wearing the "03 Cat" name. It previews the brand's entry into the European market and was shown alongside the 01 Cat and 02 Cat, both rebadged from the Good Cat. Then in 2022 at the Thailand International Motor Expo bearing the Grand Cat name.

Styling of the Ora Lightning Cat is controversial as it heavily resembles Porsche cars such as the 911 and Panamera.

Specifications

Battery
The Ora Lightning Cat uses an 82 kWh batter pack, which has an output of 300 kW and 680 Nm of torque. It has a top speed of 180 kp/h (112 mph) and a 0–100 kp/h (0–62 mph) time of ~3 seconds. The car has a Worldwide Harmonised Light Vehicles Test Procedure (WLTP) range of 450 km.

Features
The Lightning Cat comes with Level 3 autonomous driving, allowing the car to be steered, braked, accelerated, and parked unmanned. Also featured is an AI-based cabin support system that monitors the temperature and pulse rate of the car's occupants to adjust the cabin comfort.

References

Cars of China
Retro-style automobiles
Front-wheel-drive vehicles
All-wheel-drive vehicles
Production electric cars
Sedans
Cars introduced in 2022